Visibly, formerly known as Opternative, is a telehealth Chicago-based company, founded in 2012, which provides on-line vision tests and generates eyeglasses and contact lens prescriptions for site visitors, delivering these results via email within one day of the completion of the exam. The results of the exam are reviewed by an optometrist, are considered valid prescriptions, and may be used for ordering glasses or contacts over the Internet or in person at an eyeglass retailer. The company itself does not sell any visual aids, and derives its income from the fees it charges for the exams.

, 39 US states allow optometrists to issue prescriptions over the Internet. Some states, however, have attempted to ban the company from doing business. In 2016, for example, the state of Indiana passed a law prohibiting the use of on-line eye exams for the issuance of eyeglasses prescriptions for the production of any "ophthalmic device". Visibly filed suit against the state in April 2019, claiming that the incorporation of ophthalmic devices in the telehealth ban— which also included abortion drugs and opioids — was the result of pressure from optometrists and the eyeglasses' industry rather than concern for public health, and was being used unfairly, listing the Medical Licensing Board of Indiana, Indiana Attorney General Curtis Hill and the state Director of the Consumer Protection Division, Betsy Dinardi, as defendants.

In May 2019, after heavy pressure from the American Optometric Association (AOA), the on-line vision test had been recalled by the company, according to the U.S. Food & Drug Association (FDA).

In April 2020, in response to the Coronavirus outbreak, the FDA issued guidance to expand the capability of remote ophthalmic assessment, and to facilitate patient care during the pandemic. Visibly announced it will globally provide optometrists, ophthalmologists, and optical service providers free access to its virtual vision test technology, to help patients meet their eye health needs during the pandemic.

The company did $1.8M in revenue in 2021.

References

Telehealth
2012 establishments in Illinois
Optometry
Companies based in Chicago